Aquimarina latercula  is a bacterium from the genus of Aquimarina which has been isolated from a sea-water aquarium outflow in La Jolla in the United States.

References

Further reading

External links 
Type strain of Aquimarina latercula at BacDive -  the Bacterial Diversity Metadatabase

Flavobacteria
Bacteria described in 1969